"Exceeder" is an electro house single by Mason.  It was first released on Great Stuff Recordings in late 2006, but was later rereleased with many remixes, by Tomcraft and DJ F.E.X., among others.

Adding vocals
In late 2006 and early 2007, Mason worked with Princess Superstar to create a version of Exceeder called Perfect (Exceeder), a dub of Princess Superstar's previous hit Perfect onto the instrumental Exceeder. Later, many DJs found Exceeder to be a desirable track to dub lyrics onto, and created songs such as Technologic Exceeder, Fergalicious Exceeder, and Hollaback Exceeder. Another notable mix of this track appeared on some editions of the Ministry of Sound Maximum Bass 2007 compilation, credited as Exceeder/Girl Dem Shaker by Mason/Wideboys & MC JLC

Remixes
In 2010, remixes of Felguk, Tai and Mashtronic came out, via Zip Music. The Felguk remix reached 2nd place in the Beatport Top 100.

Also in 2014 Armada published a package containing remixes by DJ Umek & Mike Vale, Kill The Buzz, Corderoy, 2CV and Sonny Wharton. The DJ Umek & Mike Vale remix ranked 1st place in the Beatport Top 100.

Trivia
 A special mix of this song is used in the game Wipeout HD and Wipeout Pulse. It is named Exceeder (Special Mix).
 There is a song in the expansion pack Spore Galactic Adventures called "Electronic" which is a remix of this song.

References

2006 singles
2006 songs
Mason (musician) songs